Triathlon had its Summer Olympics debut at the 2000 Games, in Sydney, when men's and women's individual events were first held, and has been contested since then. In 2021, at the delayed 2020 Summer Olympics a mixed team relay event was held for the first time. The sport, and its Olympic events, are governed by the International Triathlon Union, known since 2019 as World Triathlon.

Summary

History
The 2000 Summer Olympics saw the first appearance of the triathlon. 48 women and 52 men competed in separate triathlons. The distances used were the "international" or "standard" ones, with a  swim,  cycle, and a  run. The 2004 triathlon was identical to the first in distance, but the 100-athlete quota was evened between 50 women and 50 men. The quota was further increased to 55 women and 55 men for the 2008 Beijing Olympics and remained the same for London 2012 and Rio 2016.

Results summary

Only one athlete, Great Britain's Alistair Brownlee, has ever won the Olympic triathlon twice (in 2012 and 2016), making him the most successful Olympic triathlete. Brother Jonathan Brownlee uniquely has won three medals in three consecutive Games, bronze in 2012, silver in 2016 and finally a gold in the inaugural team relay in 2020, thus making him the most decorated Olympic triathlete, and the only three time medalist.

Several other athletes have also won two medals, including a silver and bronze for New Zealander Bevan Docherty, and two Olympic champions, Canada's Simon Whitfield and Switzerland's Nicola Spirig, who both won a gold, followed by a silver medal. Katie Zaferes, Alex Yee and Georgia Taylor-Brown became the first triathletes to win two medals in the same Games in 2021 with the introduction of the mixed relay, the latter two athletes becoming the most successful triathlete in a single Games with a gold (relay) and a silver (individual) medal.

Great Britain is the most successful nation as of 2021, with three gold, three silver and two bronze medals. New Zealand (2004) and Great Britain (2016) are the only nations to have completed a one-two finish in an individual event. No nation has yet won both women's and men's individual events at the same Games, or indeed in any Games - in fact, only two nations, Switzerland and Great Britain, have won medals in both men's and women's individual events as of 2021, and only Great Britain have won medals in all three Olympic events, managing the feat at the 2020 Games.

Men

Women

Mixed relay

Medal table
16 nations have split the thirty-nine medals awarded in the triathlon events, accurate as of the conclusion of the 2020 Olympic games.

Qualification
Qualification spots in the triathlon are allotted to National Olympic Committees (NOCs) rather than to individual athletes.

There are five ways for NOCs to earn spots in the triathlon.  NOCs can earn a maximum of three spots, though only eight nations may earn that many.  Nations beyond that may earn only two spots.

The first five spots go to the winners of the five regional qualifying tournaments.  Three more spots go to the top three triathletes of the most recent Triathlon World Championships, though any athlete that won a regional tournament is skipped in that determination.  The next 39 places go to the NOCs of those athletes highest in the ITU ranking (again, skipping those athletes that have already qualified in the first two methods).  A forty-eighth place is awarded to the host country if it has not already received a spot, or to the next highest ranked athlete if the host country has.  Two places are awarded by the Tripartite Commission. In the end, further five places are distributed to the NOCs without any quota through the ITU Points List, with one place for each continent.

Competition
The Olympic triathlon is composed of two medal events, one for men and the other for women.  Both use the same distances of 1.5 km, 40 km, and 10 km.  Mass starts are used and drafting is allowed during the cycling phase.

Because of the variability of courses and uncontrollable conditions, official time based records are not kept for the triathlon. This rule applies to Olympic games as well.

Changes for Tokyo 2020 
In the Olympic games, held in Tokyo, there will be the inclusion of a mixed relay race. Teams of two men and two women will compete on a course consisting of a 300m swim, 8 km cycle, and 2 km run before tagging a teammate.

Nations
The following nations have taken part in the triathlon competition.

See also
List of Olympic venues in triathlon
Athletics at the 1904 Summer Olympics – Men's triathlon
Gymnastics at the 1904 Summer Olympics – Men's triathlon

References

External links
 Olympic.org
 ITU homepage

 
Sports at the Summer Olympics
Olympics